Hans Sande (born 20 December 1946) is a Norwegian psychiatrist, poet, novelist and children's writer. He was born in Bergen.  He made his literary début in 1969 with the poetry collection Strime, for which he was awarded the Tarjei Vesaas' debutantpris. Among his children's books are Lita grøn grasbok from 1972 and Trastedikt from 1977.

References

1946 births
Physicians from Bergen
20th-century Norwegian poets
Norwegian male poets
20th-century Norwegian novelists
21st-century Norwegian novelists
Norwegian children's writers
Living people
Norwegian male novelists
20th-century Norwegian male writers
21st-century Norwegian male writers
Writers from Bergen